Elections to Fife Council were held on 4 May 2017, the same day as the other Scottish local government elections. The election used the 22 wards created as a result of the Local Government Commission for Scotland's 5th review which was published in September 2016, with each ward electing three or four councillors using the single transferable vote system form of proportional representation, with 75 councillors elected; a decrease of three seats from 2012 as one ward, The Lochs, was abolished.

The Scottish National Party replaced Scottish Labour as the largest party for the first time in the Fife region, although they did not gain enough seats to form a majority, and both the group leader and deputy leader lost their seats. The Scottish Conservatives made the most gains, replacing the Scottish Liberal Democrats as the third biggest party. The election also returned no Independent councillors, marking the first time the area will be without any Independent representation since the creation of Fife Regional Council in 1974.

On 18 May, the two largest parties of the new council, the SNP and Scottish Labour, signed a Power Sharing Agreement to co-run an administration. David Alexander (SNP) and David Ross (Labour) were made co-leaders, and Jim Leishman remained in his role as Provost.

Election results

Note: "Votes" are the first preference votes. The net gain/loss and percentage changes relate to the result of the previous Scottish local elections on 3 May 2012. This may differ from other published sources showing gain/loss relative to seats held at dissolution of Scotland's councils.

Ward results

West Fife and Coastal Villages
2012: 2xLab; 1xSNP; 1xIndependent
2017: 1xLab; 1xCon; 1xSNP
2012-2017 Change: 1 Con gain from Lab (One less seat in this ward for 2017)

Dunfermline North
2012: 2xLab; 1xSNP
2017: 1xCon; 1xSNP; 1xLab
2012-2017 Change: 1 Con gain from Lab

Dunfermline Central
2012: 2xLab; 1xLib Dem; 1xSNP
2017: 2xLab; 1xCon; 1xSNP
2012-2017 Change: Conservative gain one seat from Lib Dem

Dunfermline South
2012: 2xLab; 1xLib Dem; 1xSNP
2017: 1xCon; 1xSNP; 1xLib Dem; 1xLab
2012-2017 Change: Conservative gain from Labour

Rosyth
2012: 2xLab; 1xSNP
2017: 1xCon; 1xSNP; 1xLab
2012-2017: Conservative gain one seat from Labour

Inverkeithing and Dalgety Bay
2012: 2xLab; 1xSNP; 1xCon
2017: 2xSNP; 1xCon; 1xLab
2012-2017 Change: SNP gain one seat from Labour

Cowdenbeath
2012: 2xLab; 1xSNP
2017: 2xLab; 1xSNP; 1xCon
2012-2017 Change: (One additional seat in this ward for 2017) Conservative gain additional seat

 = Sitting Councillor for East Neuk and Landward Ward.

Lochgelly, Cardenden and Benarty
2012: 2xLab; 1xSNP
2017: 2xLab; 2xSNP
2012-2017 Change: (One additional seat in this ward for 2017) SNP gain additional seat

Burntisland, Kinghorn and Western Kirkcaldy
2012: 1xLab; 1xSNP; 1xLib Dem
2017: 1xCon; 1xSNP; 1xLab
2012-2017 Change: Conservative gain one seat from Lib Dem

* = Sitting Councillor for Kirkcaldy Central.

Kirkcaldy North
2012: 2xLab; 1xSNP
2017: 2xLab; 1xSNP
2012-2017 Change: No change

Kirkcaldy Central
2012: 2xLab; 1xSNP
2017: 2xLab; 1xSNP
2012-2017 Change: No change

Kirkcaldy East
2012: 2xLab; 1xSNP
2017: 1xLab; 1xSNP; 1xCon
2012-2017 Change: Conservative gain one seat from Labour

Glenrothes West and Kinglassie
2012: 2xSNP; 2xLab
2017: 2xSNP; 1xLab
2012-2017 Change: (One less seat in this ward for 2017) Labour lose seat

Glenrothes North, Leslie and Markinch
2012: 2xSNP; 2xLab
2017: 2xSNP; 1xCon; 1xLab
2012-2017 Change: Conservative gain one seat from Labour

Glenrothes Central and Thornton
2012: 2xLab; 1xSNP
2017: 2xSNP; 1xLab
2012-2017 Change: SNP gain one seat from Labour

Howe of Fife and Tay Coast
2012: 1xLib Dem; 1xSNP; 1xCon
2017: 1xLib Dem; 1xCon; 1xSNP
2012-2017 Change: No change

Tay Bridgehead
2012: 2xLib Dem; 1xSNP
2017: 2xLib Dem; 1xSNP
2012-2017 Change: No change

St. Andrews
2012: 1xCon; 1xSNP; 1xLib Dem; 1xLab
2017: 1xLib Dem; 1xCon; 1xLab; 1xSNP
2012-2017 Change: No change

East Neuk and Landward
2012: 2xLib Dem; 1xSNP
2017: 1xCon; 1xSNP; 1xLib Dem
2012-2017 Change: Conservative gain one seat from Lib Dem

Cupar
2012: 1xIndependent; 1xLib Dem; 1xSNP
2017: 1xLib Dem; 1xCon; 1xSNP
2012-2017 Change: Conservative gain one seat from Independent

Leven, Kennoway and Largo
2012: 2xLab; 2xSNP
2017: 2xSNP; 1xCon; 1xLab
2012-2017 Change: Conservative gain one seat from Labour

Buckhaven, Methil and Wemyss Villages
2012: 2xLab; 1xIndependent; 1xSNP
2017: 2xSNP; 2xLab
2012-2017 Change: SNP gain one seat from Independent

Changes since 2017 
† On 8 June 2018, Inverkeithing and Dalgety Bay Labour Councillor Lesley Laird resigned her seat as she won the MP seat for Kirkcaldy and Cowdenbeath, Shadow Scottish Secretary, and Deputy Leader of the Scottish Labour Party. A by-election was held on Thursday, 6 September 2018. The seat was won by Conservative candidate Dave Colman.
†† On 13 September 2019 Rosyth SNP Councillor Samantha Steele resigned her seat citing health reasons and family problems. A by-election was held on 14 November 2019 and Sharon Green-Wilson held the seat for the SNP. 
††† In September 2019 Dunfermline Central Conservative Cllr Alan Craig resigned his seat. A by-election was held on 14 November 2019 and Derek Glen gained the seat for the SNP
†††† On 2 December 2019 East Neuk and Landward Conservative Cllr Linda Holt resigned from the party and became an Independent calling the Tories dysfunctional.
††††† West Fife and Coastal Villages SNP Cllr Kate Stewart decided to leave the SNP and become an Independent on 25 March 2020.
††††††  East Neuk and Landward SNP John Docherty decided to leave the SNP and become an Independent as he was not selected to stand for the SNP

By-elections since 2017

References 

2017 Scottish local elections
2017
21st century in Fife
May 2017 events in the United Kingdom